Project Barbara was a project by the Kriegsmarine, which was undertaken during World War II, to improve the anti-aircraft capabilities of its ships.

History
During this project, numerous  anti-aircraft guns were to be added to all surface ships, including destroyers. In 1944 a sub-project was set up, to give small ships, including destroyers, 3.7 cm Flak M42 anti-aircraft guns. In mid–1941, the decision was made to upgrade existing  guns to either  or  guns. The decision was made to use the 5.5 cm Flak Gerät 58 anti-aircraft guns, which were in development, and which were to be able to fire  at a rate of either 120 or 150 rounds per minute, and to be capable of single shot fire. It was to be gas operated and able to work on a triaxial or quad-axial mount. This project never reached fruition, and no guns of the type were ever mounted. Later on, the decision was made to replace all  with  guns, but this too was not completed.

References

Bibliography

Kriegsmarine
Research and development in Nazi Germany